Tua Pek Kong Temple (also called as Siew San Teng Temple) is a Chinese temple situated near the waterfront of Kuching, Sarawak, Malaysia, opposite the Chinese History Museum. It is the oldest temple in the city and formed a part of the Kuching Heritage Trail.

History 
The temple is believed to had been in existence before 1839. Much of its history can only be traced back to 1843 with renovations made in 1856, 1863 and 1880. The temple survived the 1884 Great Fire of Kuching and later the Japanese invasion during World War II in 1941 when its structure remained intact despite heavy damage to town buildings nearby due to bombing by the Imperial Japanese Army (IJA). When renovation work commenced at the end of 1964, the first for eighty-four years, it was hoped that the date of the original structure would be found recorded somewhere on a beam in the roof, as is customary in all Chinese temples.

References

External links 
 

Religious buildings and structures completed in 1770
Chinese-Malaysian culture
Taoist temples in Malaysia
Buildings and structures in Kuching
Tourist attractions in Sarawak